"Ghosts" is a song by American rock band Mayday Parade. The song was released on August 27, 2013 as the lead single from their third studio album, Monsters in the Closet.

Background
On August 16, 2013, the band released the cover art for "Ghosts". On August 24, 2013, the group released a 30-second snippet of the track via Twitter. Bassist Jeremy Lenzo spoke about the meaning of the song stating, "This song has to do with your inner demons, and it portrays that in a literal sense by referring to them as ghosts and how they are always with you."

Composition
Written by members of the band and produced by Zack Odom and Kenneth Mount, the track runs at 76 BPM and is in the key of C major. Lead vocalist Derek Sander's range in the song spans from the notes G4 to A5.

Critical reception
"Ghosts" was met with generally positive reviews. The song was compared to Queen's "Bohemian Rhapsody". Luke O'Neil of MTV stated, "'Ghosts' is a pogo-worthy sprint for the bulk of its near 5 minutes, with call and response and gang vocals giving the track its charge of shout-along spirit." O'Neil complimented the groups work for their "next level of musical maturity."

Music video
The music video for "Ghosts" premiered via Entertainment Tonight on November 15, 2013 and was directed by Brant Kantor. The video showcases the band performing in and exploring a haunted hotel. Yahoo! Movies described the video as a "pop-punk video with great production value and innovative concepts." The video is filled with elements of horror, fantasy and melodrama.

Credits and personnel

Mayday Parade
 Derek Sanders – lead vocals, keyboards
 Jeremy Lenzo – bass guitar
 Alex Garcia – lead guitar
 Brooks Betts – rhythm guitar
 Jake Bundrick – drums, backing vocals

Production
 Zack Odom – producer
 Kenneth Mount – producer

Charts

Release history

References

2013 songs
2013 singles
Fearless Records singles